is a former Japanese football player. She played for Japan national team.

Club career
Sudo was born in Kokubunji on 7 April 1984. She was promoted to Nippon TV Beleza from youth team in 2000 and played until 2013. In 14 seasons, she played 156 games and scored 15 goals and the club won L.League championship 8 times. End of 2013 season, she retired.

National team career
In August 2002, Sudo was selected Japan U-20 national team for 2002 U-19 World Championship. On 12 January 2003, she debuted for Japan national team against United States. She was a member of Japan for 2003 World Cup. She subsequently played the 2006 Asian Games, where she scored against Jordan, the 2010 EAFF Championship, which Japan won, and the 2010 Asian Cup, which marked qualification for the 2011 World Cup, which Japan eventually won. She played 15 games and scored 3 goals for Japan until 2010. She also played the 2003 and 2007 Summer Universiade.

National team statistics

International goals

References

External links

1984 births
Living people
Japan Women's College of Physical Education alumni
People from Kokubunji, Tokyo
Association football people from Tokyo Metropolis
Japanese women's footballers
Japan women's international footballers
Nadeshiko League players
Nippon TV Tokyo Verdy Beleza players
2003 FIFA Women's World Cup players
Asian Games medalists in football
Footballers at the 2006 Asian Games
Women's association football defenders
Asian Games silver medalists for Japan
Medalists at the 2006 Asian Games